The Nepal cricket team toured Kenya in August and September 2022 to play five Twenty20 International (T20I) matches and three 50-over matches. This was the first series in charge for Nepal's new head coach Manoj Prabhakar, after Pubudu Dassanayake resigned in July 2022. This series was Nepal cricket team's first visit to Kenya. This was also the first international cricket at the Gymkhana Club Ground for 10 years.

Nepal won the opening fixture of the T20I series by five wickets, before the hosts levelled the series with an 18-run victory in the second match. Nepal regained the series lead with a narrow win, former captain Gyanendra Malla top-scoring with 46 in a successful run chase. Kenya again levelled the series, defending a score of just 101 to win the fourth match by 7 runs, despite Nepal's captain Sandeep Lamichhane earlier taking his first five-wicket haul in T20Is. Nepal won the final game by 31 runs to claim a 3–2 series victory. Sandeep Lamichhane was named player of the series after taking 12 wickets. This tournament marked the return of international cricket to Kenya after more than a decade. Mumbai based firm sports and media works (SMW) were the commercial partners & producers of the event.

Squads

Nepal also named Pratish GC, Jitendra Mukhiya, Harishankar Shah and Bhim Sharki as reserves.

T20I series

1st T20I

2nd T20I

3rd T20I

4th T20I

5th T20I

50-over series

1st 50-over match

2nd 50-over match

3rd 50-over match

References

External links
 Series home at ESPN Cricinfo

Associate international cricket competitions in 2022